Tevita Poasi Tupou (born 27 July 1941), styled Lord Tupou of Kolofo’ou, is a Tongan judge and former politician.

During his political career, he served as Attorney General, Minister of Justice and Deputy Prime Minister. He also worked as a lawyer. In 2008, King George Tupou V elevated him to the title of Life Peer and appointed him Law Lord (judge) in the newly formed Judicial Committee of the Privy Council.

On 3 December 2010 the King appointed Tupou as interim Speaker.

In October 2014, Tupou was appointed as Judge in the Appeal Court of Tonga, making him the first Tongan in the panel.

In June 2015 he was inducted into the Tonga National Sports Hall of Fame for his services on the Tonga Sports Association and National Olympic Committee.

Honours
National honours
  Order of Queen Sālote Tupou III, Grand Cross (31 July 2008).

References

Living people
Attorneys General of Tonga
Deputy Prime Ministers of Tonga
Judicial Committee of the Privy Council of Tonga members
Tongan lawyers
Government ministers of Tonga
Knights Grand Cross of the Order of Queen Sālote Tupou III
1941 births